The Tektitek (Tektiteko) are a Maya people in Guatemala. Their indigenous language, which is also called Tektitek, belongs to the Mamean branch of Mayan languages. Most Tektitek live in Tectitán, in the department of Huehuetenango.

Notes

Indigenous peoples in Guatemala
Huehuetenango Department
Maya peoples
Mesoamerican cultures